Betula glandulosa, the American dwarf birch, also known as resin birch or shrub birch, is a species of birch native to North America.

Description
The trunks are slender, rarely over  diameter, with smooth, dark brown bark.

It is closely related to the dwarf birch (Betula nana), and is sometimes treated as a subspecies of it, as B. nana subsp. glandulosa. It is distinguished from typical B. nana by the presence of glandular warts on the shoots and longer leaf petioles. Hybrids with several other birches occur.

Distribution and habitat

This plant occurs in arctic and cool temperate areas from Alaska east to Newfoundland and southern Greenland, and south at high altitudes to northern California, Colorado, and the Black Hills of South Dakota in the west, and locally south to northern New York in the east. In the Arctic, it occurs down to sea level, while in the south of the range, it grows as high as  altitude.

It is typically a wetland species, growing in bogs, muskegs, or other moist and nutrient-deficient soils, but can be found in a wide variety of sites, ranging from rocky subarctic locales to boreal forests with deep, organic-rich soils. It is the most common shrub at treeline in interior Alaska, forming a nearly continuous zone between the treeline and alpine tundra.

Ecology 
Many species of wildlife rely on this shrub as a food source, particularly ungulates such as moose, deer, caribou and elk. Its preference as a food source varies depending on the specific population; moose in Alberta, for example, are known to graze  on it heavily, whereas moose in Alaska are observed to eat it at low levels. Bears, small mammals, birds, and insects also rely on the shrub as a food source.

American dwarf birch provides cover for ptarmigans, and grizzly bears use it consistently to construct their dens.

This species is valued for its erosion control potential, and has been used to help stabilize stream-banks.

References

Flora of North America: Betula glandulosa, RangeMap
Hunt, D. (1993). Betula. Proceedings of the IDS Betula Symposium 2–4 October 1992. International Dendrology Society.

External links
 USDA Plants Profile for Betula glandulosa (resin birch)
Calflora Database: Betula glandulosa (Resin birch)

glandulosa
Flora of Subarctic America
Flora of Western Canada
Flora of Eastern Canada
Flora of Alaska
Flora of the Northwestern United States
Flora of the Southwestern United States
Flora of the Northeastern United States
Flora of the Western United States
Flora of California
Flora of Greenland
Flora of New Mexico
Flora of the Cascade Range
Flora of the Rocky Mountains
Flora of the North-Central United States